Valentina Tăzlăuanu (5 January 1950 – 3 June 2020) was a writer (essayist), journalist and theatre critic from the Republic of Moldova. She was the editor in chief of Sud-Est. Graduated from Moldova State University in 1971, she worked for Radio Moldova, as Senior Editor at the Committee for Book Publishing, as Chief of Arts Department at Literatura şi Arta magazine (1977–1990) and Deputy Minister of Culture (1997–2000). She was also a member of the Moldovan Writers' Union as well as member and Secretary of PEN Club Moldova.

Awards 
 Maestru în Artă, 2009.

Works 
 "Măsura de prezenţă", essays, ed. Hyperion, 1991;
 "Discursuri paralele", essays, ed. Cartier, 2005;
 "Lumea după Hamlet", essays, Chişinău, 2011.

References

Valentina Tăzlăuanu at www.sud-est.md
Valentina Tăzlăuanu at www.uniuneascriitorilor.md

External links 
 60 de ani de la naşterea publicistei şi criticului de teatru Valentina Tăzlăuanu (5 ian. 1950).

1950 births
People from Rîșcani District
Moldovan journalists
Moldovan essayists
Moldova State University alumni
2020 deaths
Moldovan women journalists
Moldovan women essayists
20th-century journalists
20th-century women writers
20th-century essayists
21st-century journalists
21st-century women writers
21st-century essayists
Moldovan women writers